The 1968 Cork Senior Football Championship was the 80th staging of the Cork Senior Football Championship since its establishment by the Cork County Board in 1887. The draw for the opening round fixtures took place on 28 January 1968. The championship began on 7 April 1968 and ended on 6 October 1968.

Beara entered the championship as the defending champions, however, they were beaten by University College Cork at the quarter-final stage.

On 6 October 1968, Carbery won the championship following a 1-09 to 1-06 defeat of Clonakilty in a final replay. This was their second championship title overall and their first title since 1937.

Clonakilty's Tim F. Hayes was the championship's top scorer with 0-26.

Team changes

To Championship

Promoted from the Cork Intermediate Football Championship
 Urhan

Results

First round

Second round

Quarter-finals

Semi-finals

Finals

Championship statistics

Top scorers

Overall

In a single game

Miscellaneous

 Seandún qualified for the semi-final stage of the championship for the first time.
 Nemo Rangers withdrew from the championship after the club's request to move their fixture with Carbery.

References

Cork Senior Football Championship